is the sixth single of the Morning Musume subgroup Minimoni, jointly credited to . It was released on November 27, 2002 and sold 53,681 copies. It peaked at number nine on the Oricon Charts in Japan.

Track listing 
All songs written and composed by Tsunku.
 
Performed by Minimoni to Takahashi Ai + 4Kids.
 
Performed by Minimoni.
 "Genki Jirushi no Ōmori Song (Original Karaoke)"
 "Okashi Tsukutte Okkasi~! (Original Karaoke)"

Members at the time of single

External links 
 Genki Jirushi no Ōmori Song/Okashi Tsukutte Okkasi~! entry on the Hello! Project official website

Zetima Records singles
Minimoni songs
2002 singles
Songs written by Tsunku
Song recordings produced by Tsunku
Japanese-language songs
2002 songs